Medical Schools in Malaysia generally offer a five-year undergraduate program for future doctors. It is compulsory for newly graduated students to work in governmental hospitals under the housemanship program (also called internship) for a duration of at least two years that combines service and training roles. Internship may be longer at the discretion of each trainee supervisor regarding their knowledge, skills, 
competency and attitude in each particular discipline, but the total duration of the internship training should not exceed six years At the end of their internship and upon being given full registration as a doctor, every practitioner has to serve a minimum continuous period of two years within the public services upon according to section 40 of the Malaysian Medical Act 1971. As defined under Article 132 of the Federal Constitution, this service may be completed in a government healthcare facility, the Ministry of Health, or other government agencies as determined by the Director General of Health.

Admissions 

Entry to the public medical schools is very competitive. Courses last five or six years. Two years of pre-clinical training in an academic environment and three years clinical training at a teaching hospital. The medical program is usually divided into 3 phases. Phase 1 consists of the first two years of the programme involving integrated teaching and learning of the relevant basic medical sciences. Phase II (Year 3) and Phase III (Year 4 and Year 5) involve clinical skills development and subsequently consolidation of clinical clerkship in the various clinical disciplines. 

Medical schools and teaching hospitals are closely integrated. Entry requirements are basically based on Sijil Tinggi Persekolahan Malaysia (STPM), Malaysian Matriculation Programme, GCE A Level, International Baccalaureate (IB), Foundation in Science programme, Diploma in Health Sciences or Unified Examination Certificate.

Current medical schools

References 

 
Malaysia
Medical schools